The Other Zoey is an upcoming American romantic comedy film directed by Sara Zandieh. The film will star Josephine Langford.

Cast
Josephine Langford as Zoey Miller
Drew Starkey
Archie Renaux
Andie MacDowell
Heather Graham
Patrick Fabian
Mallori Johnson
Maggie Thurmon
Jorge López
Gabriella Saraivah
Amalia Yoo

Production
In December 2021, it was announced that Langford, Starkey and Renaux were cast in the film.  Later that same month, it was announced that MacDowell, Graham and Fabian joined the cast and that production began in North Carolina.  In January 2022, it was announced that Johnson, Thurmon, López, Saraivah and Yoo joined the cast of the film.

References

External links
 

Upcoming films
American romantic comedy films
Films shot in North Carolina